Edna Zyl Modie (April 14, 1886 – November 14, 1981) was an American painter and founding member of the Pomona Valley Art Association.

Biography 
Modie was born to Charles C. and Lillian Janette Modie. Her family moved from Walnut Creek in 1887 to various places in Southern California, and settling in Los Angeles around 1891. Modie graduated from Los Angeles High School in 1904, and from Los Angeles School of Art and Design in 1907. She also taught at the California School of Artistic Whistling in Los Angeles, California. Modie previously studied under Agnes Woodward, the founder of the school.

References 

1886 births
1981 deaths
People from Walnut Creek, California
Place of death missing
Los Angeles High School alumni
Painters from California
20th-century American painters
20th-century American women artists
American women painters
American art educators